Icabarú Airport  is an airport serving the village of Icabarú in the Bolívar state of Venezuela.
 
The Icabaru non-directional beacon (Ident: ICA) is located on the field.

See also
Transport in Venezuela
List of airports in Venezuela

References

External links
OpenStreetMap - Icabarú
OurAirports - Icabarú
SkyVector - Icabarú Airport

Airports in Venezuela